Bunyu Airport is an airport located in Bunyu, Tarakan, North Kalimantan, Indonesia.

Airlines and destinations

The following airlines offer passenger service.

References

Airports in North Kalimantan
Tarakan